TVC News is a Nigerian news 24 hour television news channel based in Lagos. The channel airs on British Sky Broadcasting Group Plc (BSKYb) in the UK, Naspers Ltd. (NPN)'s DStv and Startimes in Nigeria, and Multi TV in Ghana.

Former CEO Nigel Parsons states "Without shying away from reporting the conflicts or the corruption, the famines or the wars, the mission of TVC News is also to tell the many positive stories coming out of Africa. Stories – good or bad – will be told '
'through African eyes'."
    
The network aired its first public broadcasting run on February 28, 2013. It began airing in the UK on BSkyB on June 17, 2013. In its first few months the network's staff has received awards from the Association for International Broadcasting (AIB) and the International Center for Journalists based out of Washington, D.C. As of 2014 the station is said to have reached about five million households in Africa and Europe with interest from cable and satellite providers to expand its market share.

References

Foreign television channels broadcasting in the United Kingdom
English-language television stations
24-hour television news channels in Nigeria
Television channels and stations established in 2013
Television stations in Lagos
Companies based in Lagos